Jesus Egg That Wept is the second solo album by Danielle Dax, an English experimental musician and former member of the Lemon Kittens. It was originally recorded and released in 1984 on the Awesome Records label. The album was re-released in 1993 on the Biter Of Thorpe label (BOT131-02CD) and distributed through World Serpent Distribution.

Dax wrote and produced all the songs on the album as well as playing the guitar, honky-tonk piano, drums, bass, flute, keyboards, tenor saxophone, tapes, TR-808, synths, metal kalimba and providing the vocals. Additional instruments were played by David Knight on Evil-Honky Stomp and Fortune Cheats; Karl Blake, another former member of the Lemon Kittens, provided additional sounds on Ostrich. Cover artwork was again created by Holly Warburton. Warburton's artwork can be found on most of Dax's early work.

The album originally contained the song "Here Come the Harvest Buns", which had previously appeared on her debut LP Pop-Eyes. The song was removed from the track list when the album was issued on CD for the first time in 1993.

Track listing

Charts

Release History

References

External links
Danielle Dax Official Website
Danielle Dax Artist Profile
The Danielle Dax Profile

1984 albums
Danielle Dax albums